Jack Robert Tucker (born 13 November 1999) is an English professional footballer who plays as a defender for EFL League One club Milton Keynes Dons.

Club career

Gillingham
Tucker joined the academy of Gillingham as a seven-year old from his hometown club Whitstable Town.

Having progressed through the academy system, he made his league debut for the club on 8 October 2017 as a 45th-minute substitute in a 1–0 defeat to Portsmouth, and soon after signed professional terms in January 2018. During his first two seasons as a professional, Tucker had short loan spells with Isthmian League clubs Greenwich Borough and Hastings United, and featured twice in the EFL Trophy for Gillingham. Following impressive performances, he was rewarded with a contract extension at the end of the 2018–19 season. 

On 12 November 2019, Tucker scored his first professional goal in a 2–0 home EFL Trophy win over Tottenham Hotspur U21s. Having broken into the first team, a month later he was the subject of a transfer bid in December 2019 from an unnamed Championship club, which was rejected by Gillingham chairman Paul Scally and the same day Tucker signed a further contract extension with the club. He was named as the Kent side's young Player of the Season at the conclusion of the 2019–20 season.

On 6 March 2021, he scored his first league goal for Gillingham in a 3–1 victory over Ipswich Town. 

Following the club's relegation to League Two at the end of the 2021–22 season, Tucker rejected the offer of a new deal in favour of a move elsewhere, bringing an end to his fifteen-year association with Gillingham. At the club's end of season awards he was named Young Player of the Season, winning the award for the third successive year and the fourth time overall.

Milton Keynes Dons
On 17 June 2022, Tucker signed for League One club Milton Keynes Dons on a long-term contract, with compensation owed to Gillingham due to his age. He made his debut on 30 July 2022 in a 1–0 defeat away to Cambridge United.

Career statistics

Honours 
Individual
 Gillingham Young Player of the Season: 2017–18, 2019–20, 2020–21, 2021–22

References

1999 births
Living people
English footballers
Footballers from Kent
Whitstable Town F.C. players
Gillingham F.C. players
Greenwich Borough F.C. players
Hastings United F.C. players
Milton Keynes Dons F.C. players
English Football League players
Association football defenders